Raul Amaya (born February 2, 1986) is an American mixed martial artist who competes in Bellator's welterweight division. Amaya is a former Art of Fighting Welterweight Champion.

MMA career

Early career

Amaya started his career in 2009. He fought only for the Florida-based organization Art of Fighting.

There he compiled an undefeated record of 9–0 and earned the welterweight title before signing with Bellator.

Bellator Fighting Championships

Amaya made his debut on March 30, 2012, at Bellator 63 against the UFC and Bellator veteran Ben Saunders in the quarterfinal match of Bellator season six welterweight tournament. Amaya had his first defeat via unanimous decision.

Amaya faced Kenny Moss on July 20, 2012, at Bellator 72. He won via TKO in the second round.

Amaya faced José Gomes on January 24, 2013, at Bellator 86 in the quarterfinal match of Bellator season eight welterweight tournament. He won via TKO in the very first round.

In the semifinals, Amaya faced Ben Saunders in a rematch. The fight took place on February 21, 2013, at Bellator 90. Amaya lost via knock out in the first round.

Championships and accomplishments
Art of Fighting
AOF Welterweight Championship (One time)

Mixed martial arts record

|-
|Loss
|align=center|11–3
|Avery McPhatter
|Technical Submission (Triangle Choke)
|RFC34 - It's Time
|
|align=center|1
|align=center|2:40
|Tampa, Florida, United States
|
|-

|-
|Loss
|align=center|11–2
|Ben Saunders
|KO (head kick)
|Bellator 90
|
|align=center|1
|align=center|2:56
|West Valley City, Utah, United States
|Bellator Season 8 Welterweight Tournament Semifinal
|-

|Win
|align=center|11–1
|José Gomes
|TKO (punches)
|Bellator 86
|
|align=center|1
|align=center|3:12
|Thackerville, Oklahoma, United States
|<small>Bellator Season 8 Welterweight Tournament Quarterfinal
|-
|Win
|align=center|10–1
|Kenny Moss
|TKO (shoulder injury)
|Bellator 72
|
|align=center|2
|align=center|0:30
|Tampa, Florida, United States
|
|-
|Loss
|align=center|9–1
|Ben Saunders
|Decision (unanimous)
|Bellator 63
|
|align=center|3
|align=center|5:00
|Uncasville, Connecticut, United States
|Bellator Season 6 Welterweight Tournament Quarterfinal
|-
|Win
|align=center|9–0
|Jesse Lawrence
|Technical submission (guillotine choke)
|AOF 13 - Amaya vs. Lawrence
|
|align=center|4
|align=center|0:33
|Estero, Florida, United States
|Won Art of Fighting Welterweight Title
|-
|Win
|align=center|8–0
|Daniel McWilliams
|Submission (rear-naked choke)
|AOF 12 - Static
|
|align=center|2
|align=center|3:30
|Jacksonville, Florida, United States
|
|-
|Win
|align=center|7–0
|Koa Ramos
|Submission (rear-naked choke)
|AOF 11 - Fusion
|
|align=center|2
|align=center|1:57
|Tampa, Florida, United States
|
|-
|Win
|align=center|6–0
|Levi LaLonde
|KO (punches)
|AOF 10 - Nightmare
|
|align=center|1
|align=center|1:56
|Estero, Florida, United States
|
|-
|Win
|align=center|5–0
|Joe Robinson
|Submission (rear-naked choke)
|AOF 8 - Fury
|
|align=center|3
|align=center|4:18
|Estero, Florida, United States
|
|-
|Win
|align=center|4–0
|Daniel Lovett
|Submission (rear-naked choke)
|AOF 7 - Payday
|
|align=center|3
|align=center|1:00
|Tampa, Florida, United States
|
|-
|Win
|align=center|3–0
|Rory Shallcross
|TKO (punches)
|AOF 5 - Rumble at Robarts 5
|
|align=center|3
|align=center|1:18
|Sarasota, Florida, United States
|
|-
|Win
|align=center|2–0
|Francois Ambang
|Submission (rear-naked choke)
|AOF 3 - Rumble at Robarts 3
|
|align=center|1
|align=center|3:32
|Sarasota, Florida, United States
|
|-
|Win
|align=center|1–0
|Mackenzie Briggs
|TKO (punches)
|AOF 2 - Rumble at Robarts 2
|
|align=center|1
|align=center|1:01
|Sarasota, Florida, United States
|

References

External links

1986 births
Living people
American male mixed martial artists
Welterweight mixed martial artists
Place of birth missing (living people)
Sportspeople from Bradenton, Florida